"Working Man" is a 1974 song by Rush.

Working Man or Working Men may refer to:

 Working man, a member of a workforce

Film
Working Man (film), a 2019 American drama film
The Working Man, a 1933 American film
 Working Man Trilogy, three American gay pornographic films of the late 1970s

Music
 "Working Man" (John Conlee song), 1985
 "Working Man", a 1990 song by Rita MacNeil
 "Working Man", a song by Imagine Dragons from the deluxe edition of the 2012 album Night Visions
 "The Working Man", a song by Creedence Clearwater Revival from the 1968 album Creedence Clearwater Revival
 Working Man – A Tribute to Rush, a 1996 album by various artists
 Working Men, a 2009 live compilation album by Rush

See also
 
 
 Worker (disambiguation)
 Working class, those engaged in waged or salaried labour, especially in manual-labour occupations and industrial work
 Homo ergaster, considered an early form or variety of Homo erectus
 Two Working Men, a pair of 1969 statues by Oisín Kelly in CorkHomo faber''